Acetyl-coenzyme A transporter 1 also known as solute carrier family 33 member 1 (SLC33A1) is a protein that in humans is encoded by the SLC33A1 gene.

Function 

The protein encoded by this gene is required for the formation of O-acetylated (Ac) gangliosides. The encoded protein is predicted to contain 6 to 10 transmembrane domains, and a leucine zipper motif in transmembrane domain III.

Clinical significance 

Defects in this gene have been reported to cause spastic paraplegia autosomal dominant type 42 (SPG42) in one Chinese family, but not in similar patients of European descent.

References

Further reading 

 
 
 
 
 
 
 
 

Solute carrier family